Jim Cathcart is an American entrepreneur, speaker and author.

Career

Cathcart has authored 23 books (including "HI-REV for Small Business", "Intelligent Curiosity", Relationship Selling and The Acorn Principle) and numerous recorded programs while traveling internationally to provide speeches at seminars, conferences, and workshops. He is a TEDx presenter and serves as a strategic advisor and consultant. Cathcart is the original author and creator of the concept of Relationship Selling. He is a Certified Speaking Professional (CSP) from the National Speakers Association.

In the years 2015 through 2019 Mr. Cathcart delivered scores of presentations all over mainland China on behalf of World Masters Speakers Bureau (Dr. David Chu) based near Shanghai in the Song Jiang province. He spoke in 23 cities to tens of thousands of young business people and business owners. He also recorded a musical album "Fireside Songs" (19 songs) while in Taipei, Taiwan. His books, The Self Motivation Handbook, Relationship Selling and You Are The Speaker have been translated into Chinese and published there. He conducted a year long academy program called "Skyliners Academy" with seminars in Thames Town, Li Jiang, Shanghai and on Yangtze River Cruises. In 2019 he traveled to China for 6 separate lecture tours.

After 37 years in California, he moved Cathcart Institute to Austin, Texas in 2020. His primary activities during Covid19 were Mentorship for Small Groups of High Achievers via Zoom and telephone plus weekly podcasts, interviews, webinars and articles. He conducts the Mentorship program "The Going Pro Experience." 

Television and Video: Jim Cathcart has created multiple video programs and courses. In late 2022 TomeApp.com produced 2 video courses featuring Jim Cathcart: Acorns to Oaks, Make Your Dreams Into A Reality, and Sales Strategies for Start Ups and Entrepreneurs, both to be published in early 2023. In early 2022 Biz Library out of St. Louis, MO published Professional Selling, a 30 lesson video course by Jim Cathcart. 
McCuistionTV.com produces a PBS TV show on KERA in Dallas, Texas that has been on the air for over 33 years. Jim Cathcart was added as a cohost on this show beginning in early 2022.  
He can also be seen daily on Thrive15.com and TSTN.com while he also gives weekly radio interviews. Cathcart has been published and quoted in numerous media outlets including San Fernando Valley Business Journal, Pacific Coast Business Times, Investor's Business Daily, Townhall.com, and Huffington Post.

Awards and honors

On September 25, 2021, Jim Cathcart received an Honorary Bachelor of Science in Business Administration degree from High Point University in North Carolina. This was due to his 21 published books, 3,300 professional speeches and career of leadership and contributions in professional education. Cathcart was inducted into the Sales & Marketing Hall of Fame in 2012 for his lifetime of work associated with his book and concept of Relationship Selling. He is listed in the Professional Speakers Hall of Fame, is a recipient of the Golden Gavel Award, has been the president of the National Speakers Association and received their Cavett Award for a lifetime of service. The San Diego chapter of the National Speakers Association renamed their member of the year award "The Jim Cathcart Service Award" and the Greater Los Angeles chapter gave him their Lifetime Achievement Award in 2003. In 2008, he was inducted as one of the "Legends of the Speaking Profession."
In the 2022 ranking of Top 30 Global Gurus, Mr. Cathcart was ranked No. 7 in Sales Gurus and No. 19 in Motivational Speakers worldwide. Also in 2022, he was chosen as the keynote speaker for Toastmasters International's convention Augst 17, 2022 in Nashville, Tennessee. 

He was selected as one of the Top 5 Sales & Customer Service Speakers by Speaking.com (2010, 2011, 2012, 2013, and 2014) and was listed as one of Top 50 Sales Influencers in the World by Top Sales World (2014, 2015, and 2016). He was named among a listing of Top 25 Speakers (2015, 2016, 2017) selected by over 27,000 voting. Listed in Top 25 Speakers of 2022 by iDominate Speaker Magazine in July 2022.

Background

Cathcart is a graduate of Arkansas Military Academy and attended the University of Arkansas at Little Rock. He is also a singer, songwriter, and guitarist. He has served as an Artist in Residence for High Point University and serves on the Dean's Advisory Council to the School of Management at California Lutheran University, where he is also their first Entrepreneur in Residence.

He is also a former board member of the Boys & Girls Clubs of Greater Conejo Valley. In 1975–77, he served as the Senior Program Manager for Individual Development (programs) for the United States Junior Chamber of Commerce, The Jaycees.

Selected bibliography
 Madden, Dennis and Jim Cathcart. title "Hi-Rev for Small Business, A Faster Way to Profits." publisher: Beyond Publishing 2022. 152 pages. 
 Cathcart, Jim (with Lisa Patrick). title Intelligent Curiosity, The Art of Finding More. publisher: Beyond Publishing 2021. 168 pages. 
 
 
 
 
 
 Cathcart, Jim (2020). The Power Minute: Your motivation handbook for activating your dreams and transforming your life. Highlands Ranch, CO: Authors Place Press. pp. 301 pages. .

References

External links
 Official site

21st-century American non-fiction writers
American businesspeople
American male non-fiction writers
Living people
University of Arkansas at Little Rock alumni
Year of birth missing (living people)
Place of birth missing (living people)
21st-century American male writers